The Monsters Inside is a BBC Books original novel written by Stephen Cole and based on the long-running British science fiction television series Doctor Who. It was published on 19 May 2005, alongside The Clockwise Man and Winner Takes All. It features the Ninth Doctor and Rose Tyler.

Synopsis
The TARDIS takes the Doctor and Rose to the Justicia System - a prison camp comprising the six planets in that solar system. The pair are separated and trapped in different environments, each determined to escape in their own distinctive style. However, their plans are complicated when some old enemies show up. Are the Slitheen really attempting a takeover of Justicia, or is it something far more sinister?

Plot

The TARDIS lands on a different planet, and Rose 'was, officially, Somewhere Else.'  The Doctor isn't sure where they are, and says it was 'like something in the area drew us down...'  They walk to the lip of a rise, and see people building pyramids.  As they turn, four men, each with a whip and 'futuristic space gun,' are creeping up behind them.  A fight ensues, and the Doctor and Rose are captured and taken away in separate ships.  The Doctor tells Rose, 'Wherever they take you, I'll get you back.'

The Doctor is taken to a plain grey room.  He is scanned, found to be an alien, gassed, and sent away.  He wakes to see a short woman who introduces herself as Senator Lazlee Flowers and tells him that he is at SCAT-house (Species-led Creative and Advanced Technologies).  She explains that they are on  Justice Alpha of the Justica system, which is a prison, and that they should have seen the auto-beacons and deflection barrier warning them to stay away.  Aliens go to this planet to work on projects, and can get time off their sentence or royalties for good results.

Rose is put on a shuttle and taken to another planet.  Warders Blanc and Norris tell her that she has been assigned to Detention Centre Six on Justica Beta.  They tell her that she can put in a plea to the Governor, but right now she needs to leave the ship.  She is attacked by a group of inmates, but rescued by Block-walker Dennel.

The Doctor talks to Flowers.  She says that his ship can't be entered or moved.  He tells her 'I put the handbrake on so we wouldn't go anywhere else in a hurry.'  They discuss the difficulties of escape, and she tells him to find out.  He puts his hand to a door, and grey globules descend from the roof and stick all over him, preventing him from moving.  Flowers says they respond to anti-social behavior as well.

He is temporarily assigned a room with two Slitheen, Dram Fel Fotch and his brother Ecktosca Fel Fotch Heppen-Bar Slitheen.  They tell the Doctor that 'the family' has gotten out of 'the family business.'  Dram and Ecktosca are searching for their ancestor's personal effects, including their compression fields.  They were arrested after being tricked into breaking into a building on Justica Delta.

After breakfast, Rose is assigned to work in the kitchens, where some other inmates cause trouble that she is blamed for.  She is taken to see the governor, and sees a flickering blue light coming out of his office accompanied by a really bad smell.  She is sure he is a Slitheen, especially since he is a large person, but she can't see a zipper and he claims the flickering light was a malfunctioning desk lamp. He sentences Rose to a minimum of 25 years in prison.

The next morning, the grey globs grab the Doctor and take him to a room with a variety of aliens working on a gravity experiment.  The Doctor and one of the other aliens (a Sucrosian named Nesshalop) come up with a breakthrough within a few minutes, but break the console in the process.  The globs descend on both of them, causing pain as punishment for the destruction.  The translation circuit is also broken, so only the Doctor can give the supervisors the solution.

Rose's second day is much like her first, but the Governor is eating lunch in her block today.  She starts a food fight, and in the confusion tackles him so she can look for a zipper.  She doesn't find one, and is thrown into solitary confinement.

Flowers goes to see Consul Issabel, the Technocrat Major of Justica Prime.  Flowers tells her about the breakthrough, and that the Doctor insists that he needs his astrophysicist friend to finish solving the problem.  Issabel says she will think on it.  While the Doctor is back in his cell, he goes through the Slitheens' nests, finds a homemade compression field, and deduces that they must have escape plans, which Ecktosca confirms when he catches the Doctor looking at it.

Rose is visited by Warder Norris, who says that he is an undercover agent, because people are vanishing, but hasn't heard from any of his superiors in months.  Blanc comes in, kills him easily, and then unzips her head.  Rose gets out of her cell, then realizes that's what the Slitheen wanted all along.  At the last moment, two other warders come along, sent by the Governor to fetch her.

The Doctor is awoken during the night, and told to come to the meeting room. Flowers is there, and tells him that he will be talking to his expert over videolink.  While they wait, they talk about the planetary orbits, and how they are perfect circles, and perfectly spaced for using an amplified gravity wave to open a warp-hole.

Rose is brought into the Governor's office, and sits down to talk to the Doctor. He tells her that there is a test she needs to pass 'with no help.'  Flowers asks her the question, and the Doctor tells Rose that if the project works, they will 'get a royalty that could bring in a lot of cash - and we're talking telephone numbers.'  When told to be quiet, he tells Rose, 'Mum's the word.'  She tells the Doctor that someone might think he's 'sending me a coded message' and he responds 'No. No codes.'  So Rose gives them her mum's phone number, and Flowers says it's close, especially since it was a mental calculation, and then asks about the Warp overlay. The Doctor then sneaks the second number to her by talking about the Fowlers' Albert Square address from the EastEnders (Rose had made the Doctor spend a day with her catching up on missed storylines).  Issabel tells the Governor to send Rose there immediately.  Meanwhile, alarms are going off on Justica Alpha, because the Slitheen have escaped.

Rose is on the shuttle when she sees smoke seeping out from under the bulkhead door.  She bangs on the door to the cabin. Eventually the pilot comes out to investigate, and is dragged into the smoky hold when he opens the door.  The alarm goes silent, and Block-walker Dennel comes out.  He has seen what happened with Norris and Blanc, and thinks he is rescuing Rose.  They drag the unconscious pilot to the cabin door and use his hand to open the touchpad.  The console starts beeping a countdown, wanting input from the pilot, and when Rose and Dennel try to move him, they realize he's got a zipper in his head.

In order to keep the shuttle moving, they remove the hand skin from the Raxacoricofallapatorian, and use it like a glove to abort the countdown.  It wakes up, and they run to the cabin and close the door.  Unfortunately, Dennel is knocked against the controls as the pilot beats on the door.  They realize the ship is heading for a planet, and Dennel comments, 'The big bad wolf's ready to blow our house down.'  When the monster gets in, Rose tells him not to hurt Dennel, but to prevent the ship from crashing.  It says that it has orders not to harm them, and starts to work on the controls.  In spite of its efforts, the ship crashes.

The Doctor has the gravity workshop constructing the core of an amplifier when Flowers comes in.  He asks her about the return of his sonic screwdriver, and then tells her that the orbits of the planets in this system have been changed.  When Flowers goes to talk to Issabel, she accidentally sees her remove her skin to reveal a monster that is 'bigger and paler than either Ecktosca or Dram Fel Fotch.'  As Flowers tries to sneak away, Ermenshrew (Issabel) hears her and gives chase.  She comes across the Doctor, and they take off for the systems hub.  The corridor is very narrow, and Ermenshrew has trouble coming after them.

Rose and Dennel are on Justice Delta.  The monster tricks Rose into calling for help, knowing that there are no longer any humans on the planet, just more monsters like himself.  He also tells her that he is a Blathereen, not a Slitheen.

The Doctor tells Flowers to change the gravity settings to zero.  As soon as she does so, the two of them float up to the ceiling shelves where the globs live.  The Doctor tells her to switch on the sonic screwdriver (which she had brought along to return to him) for light.  There are corridors between the shelves that connect the various rooms of SCAT-house.  As they crawl through them, they find Ecktosca and Dram disguised as globs.

Rose awakes Dennel, and the two of them take off through the trees.  They come to a clearing that is filled with the remains of all the humans who have gone missing from Justica Beta.  They find the monitoring station that the shuttle had crashed into when it landed, and by looking at all the screens, figure out what is happening.  They see Warder Robsen appear in the clearing, and run out to get him.  They find the portal that he came through, but are unable to make it work.

Ecktosca tells the Doctor and Rose that there are warp-hole pathways joining all the worlds in Justica.  The Blathereen are using the work done at SCAT-house to improve and enlarge them.  The Doctor realizes that they are what drew the TARDIS.  Flowers realizes the portal must be in the aquaculture compound, which has been shut down for months.  The four of them make their way there, Ecktosca activates the portal, Dram follows, and then the Doctor and Flowers.  They end up in a small room on Justice Delta, and the Doctor uses the sonic screwdriver to offset the portal and prevent Ermenshrew from following them.  As he finishes, they are discovered.

Meanwhile, back on Justica Beta, the prisoners stage a revolt.

Rose, Dennel, and Robsen are running from the Blathereen, when the monitoring station comes crashing past them.  They all jump in.  Rose sees the Doctor on one of the monitoring screens, and they turn the volume up to hear what is happening.

The Doctor, Flowers, Ecktosca, and Dram are taken to the Blathereen leader, Don Arco.  He tells them that what they want to do is create a super-portal that will allow them to move the entire Justica system.  Then they will use its suns to burn another system into fissile material to sell.  The prisoners remaining in the Justica system will be used to process the material.  Then a monitoring platform crashes into the building, and another.  The Doctor and Flowers take advantage of the aftermath to escape.

Rose, Dennel and Robsen find that their station is moving faster now that it's out of the trees and approaching the building, so they decide to jump out.  They see the Doctor and Flowers emerge from it, and when Rose jumps, the Doctor catches her, but they both fall.  He grins and says 'Found you.'

As they talk, Blathereen begin to emerge from the building, and all five take off running for the forest.  Suddenly they hear 'cheering and clattering and crashing and shrieking' and see hundreds of detention centre kids coming after the monsters.

Another Slitheen shows up (Callis, the aunt of Ecktosca and Dram), and the three of them, the Doctor, Rose, Robsen, and Flowers head back to Justice Alpha to destroy the work that was done at SCAT-house.  Don Arco and Ermenshaw are there ahead of them, starting to activate the project.

The Doctor has Rose and Flowers turn off the gravity again, while Ecktosca, Callis, and Robsen wreck the gravity warp equipment.  Dram works on the compression field, and the Doctor heads back to the gravity workshop.  They manage to sabotage the works, and when Ermenshrew hits the switch, the room explodes.  The Doctor and Rose go back to the TARDIS and leave the system.  Dram, Ecktosca and Callis celebrate the fall of the Blathereen and the beginning of "a new golden age of crime" for the Slitheen.

Continuity
This is the first Ninth Doctor story, televised or otherwise, to take place away from Earth. The acknowledgements thank Russell T Davies for letting the author 'take Rose to her first alien planet'.
The Justicia System is mentioned in the episode Boom Town, making this the first spin-off book to be referenced on-screen.
This book features another family from the same race as the Slitheen, the Blathereen, who were later mentioned in The Sarah Jane Adventures double episodes Revenge of the Slitheen and The Lost Boy and appear in the season 3 story The Gift.
When under threat from a Blathereen, Dennel comments that "The big bad wolf's ready to blow our house down"; the Bad Wolf reference follows the recurring theme of Series 1.

See also

Whoniverse

External links

The Cloister Library - The Monsters Inside

2005 British novels
2005 science fiction novels
Ninth Doctor novels
Novels by Stephen Cole
Slitheen novels
Novels set on fictional planets
Novels set in prison